is a Japanese sprint canoer who competed in the late 1980s. At the 1988 Summer Olympics in Seoul, he was eliminated in the semifinals of the C-2 1000 m event.

External links
Sports-Reference.com profile

1965 births
Canoeists at the 1988 Summer Olympics
Japanese male canoeists
Living people
Olympic canoeists of Japan